Sidney Altman (May 7, 1939 – April 5, 2022) was a Canadian-American molecular biologist, who was the Sterling Professor of Molecular, Cellular, and Developmental Biology and Chemistry at Yale University. In 1989, he shared the Nobel Prize in Chemistry with Thomas R. Cech for their work on the catalytic properties of RNA.

Family and education
Altman was born on May 7, 1939, in Montreal, Quebec, Canada. His parents, Ray (Arlin), a textile worker, and Victor Altman, a grocer, were immigrants to Canada, each coming from Eastern Europe as a young adult, in the 1920s. Altman's mother was from Białystok in Poland, and had come to Canada with her sister at the age of eighteen, learning English and working in a textile factory to earn money to bring the rest of their family to Quebec. Altman's father, born in Ukraine, had been a worker on a collective farm in the Soviet Union. He was sponsored to come to Canada as a farm worker, but later, as a husband and a father of two sons, he supported the family by running a small grocery store in Montreal. Sidney Altman was later to look back on his parents' lives as an illustration of the value of the work ethic: "It was from them I learned that hard work in stable surroundings could yield rewards, even if only in infinitesimally small increments."

As Altman reached adulthood, the family's financial situation had become secure enough that he was able to pursue a college education. He went to the United States to study physics at the Massachusetts Institute of Technology. While at MIT, he was a member of the ice hockey team. After achieving his bachelor's degree from MIT in 1960, Altman spent 18 months as a graduate student in physics at Columbia University. Due to personal concerns and the lack of opportunity for beginning graduate students to participate in laboratory work, he left the program without completing the degree. Some months later, he enrolled as a graduate student in biophysics at the University of Colorado Medical Center. His project was a study of the effects of acridines on the replication of bacteriophage T4 DNA. He received his Ph.D. in biophysics from the University of Colorado in 1967 with thesis advisor Leonard Lerman; Lerman went in 1967 to Vanderbilt University, where Altman worked briefly as a researcher in molecular biology before leaving for Harvard.

Altman was married to Ann M. Körner (daughter of Stephan Körner) in 1972. They are the parents of two children, Daniel and Leah. Having lived primarily in the United States since departing Montreal to attend MIT in 1958, Altman became a U.S. citizen in 1984, maintaining dual citizenship as a Canadian citizen as well.

Career
After receiving his Ph.D., Altman embarked upon the first of two research fellowships. He joined Matthew Meselson's laboratory at Harvard University to study a DNA endonuclease involved in the replication and recombination of T4 DNA. Later, at the MRC Laboratory of Molecular Biology in Cambridge, England, Altman started the work that led to the discovery of RNase P and the enzymatic properties of the RNA subunit of that ribozyme. John D. Smith, as well as several postdoctoral colleagues, provided Altman with very good advice that enabled him to test his ideas. "The discovery of the first radiochemically pure precursor to a tRNA molecule enabled me to get a job as an assistant professor at Yale University in 1971, a difficult time to get any job at all".

Altman's career at Yale followed a standard academic pattern with promotion through the ranks until he became Professor in 1980. He was Chairman of his department from 1983 to 1985 and in 1985 became the Dean of Yale College for four years. On July 1, 1989, he returned to the post of Professor on a full-time basis. His doctoral students include Ben Stark.

While at Yale, Altman's Nobel Prize work came with the analysis of the catalytic properties of the ribozyme RNase P, a ribonucleoprotein particle consisting of both a structural RNA molecule and one (in prokaryotes) or more (in eukaryotes) proteins. Originally, it was believed that, in the bacterial RNase P complex, the protein subunit was responsible for the catalytic activity of the complex, which is involved in the maturation of tRNAs. During experiments in which the complex was reconstituted in test tubes, Altman and his group discovered that the RNA component, in isolation, was sufficient for the observed catalytic activity of the enzyme, indicating that the RNA itself had catalytic properties, which was the discovery that earned him the Nobel Prize. Although the RNase P complex also exists in eukaryotic organisms, his later work revealed that in those organisms, the protein subunits of the complex are essential to the catalytic activity, in contrast to the bacterial RNase P.

Recognition
Altman was elected a Fellow of the American Academy of Arts and Sciences in 1988 and a member of both the National Academy of Sciences and the American Philosophical Society in 1990.

Death
Altman died on April 5, 2022, in Rockleigh, New Jersey, after a long illness.

Bibliography

See also
 History of RNA biology
 List of RNA biologists

References

External links
Sidney Altman Nobel Lecture: Enzymatic Cleavage of RNA by RNA
Altman S Author Profile Page on Pubget
Sidney Altman U.C. Berkeley Conversations with History University of California at Berkeley Interview
Sidney Altman Papers (MS 1680). Manuscripts and Archives, Yale University Library.

1939 births
2022 deaths
Nobel laureates in Chemistry
American Nobel laureates
Canadian Nobel laureates
American molecular biologists
American biophysicists
American people of Polish-Jewish descent
American people of Ukrainian-Jewish descent
Canadian biologists
Canadian biophysicists
Canadian expatriate academics in the United States
Jewish Canadian scientists
Canadian people of Polish-Jewish descent
Canadian people of Ukrainian-Jewish descent
Columbia Graduate School of Arts and Sciences alumni
Harvard University staff
Jewish American scientists
MIT Department of Physics alumni
Members of the United States National Academy of Sciences
Canadian molecular biologists
Academics from Montreal
Scientists from Montreal
University of Colorado alumni
Yale Department of Molecular, Cellular, and Developmental Biology faculty
Yale Sterling Professors
Fellows of the American Academy of Arts and Sciences
Anglophone Quebec people